Bagh Bondi Khela is an Indian Bengali television supernatural soap opera that premiered on 6 January 2020 and aired on Bengali GEC Zee Bangla. The show starred Rubel Das and Ishani Das in lead roles and Rukma Roy as the main antagonist.

Cast

Main
 Ishani Das as Raya 
 Rubel Das as Siddharta

Recurring
 Rukma Roy as Brinda
 Bodhisattwa Majumdar as Siddhartha's father
 Nandini Chatterjee as Rohini- Siddhartha's mother
 Suchismita Chowdhury as Nandini- Brinda's mother, Rohini's friend
 Basanti Chatterjee as Siddhartha's grandmother 
 Animesh Bhaduri as Akash
 Twarita Chatterjee as Sonia 
 Poushmita Goswami as Akash's mother
 Deerghoi Paul as Jinia
 Ratan Sarkhel as Raya's father
 Kaushiki Guha as Raya's mother
 Sananda Basak as Rakha
 Kanchana Moitra as Raya's aunt
 Aemila Sadhukhan as Pola 
 Swagata Mukherjee as Raya's well wiser

References

External links
 Bagh Bondi Khela at ZEE5

2020 Indian television series debuts
2020 Indian television series endings
Zee Bangla original programming